Harda District is a district of Madhya Pradesh state of central India. The town of Harda is the district headquarters. The district is part of Narmadapuram Division.  Harda district was organized in 1998.Harda is also known as 'Hridaynagari' (Also "BHuana:Fertile Land"). 

The district has an area 2644 km2, and a population 570,465 (2011 census), a 20.25% increase from 2001. Harda District is bounded by the districts of Sehore to the north, Narmadapuram to the northeast, Betul to the southeast, Khandwa to Narmadapuram District. It is part of the Narmadapuram Division of Madhya Pradesh.

Harda lies in the Narmada River valley, and the Narmada forms the district's northern boundary. The land rises towards the Satpura Range to the south. The movies Amma ki boli, Matrubhoomi, which deals with the consequences of female infanticide, was filmed in the Ranhai Kala of this district.

One of the youngest freedom movement participant from central India Guru Radha Kishan was born in 1925 in BID village of the district. Guru Radha Kishan openly challenged a British Police Official and slapped him in front of a large gathering while the officer started abusing Indians in a freedom movement rally in Indore. A widely respected Swatantrata Sangram Senani known for his integrity, honesty and transparency. He fought valiantly for the economic deprivation for the poor and underprivileged classes of society.

As of 2011 it is the least populous district of Madhya Pradesh (out of 50).

Demographics

According to the 2011 census Harda District has a population of 570,465, roughly equal to the nation of Solomon Islands or the US state of Wyoming. This gives it a ranking of 534th in India (out of a total of 640). Its population growth rate over the decade 2001-2011 was 20.25%. Harda has a sex ratio of 932 females for every 1000 males, and a literacy rate of 74.04%. 20.92% of the population lives in urban areas. Scheduled Castes and Scheduled Tribes made up 16.28% and 27.99% of the population respectively.

Hindus are 92.46% and Muslims are 6.77% of the population.

At the time of the 2011 Census of India, 89.88% of the population in the district spoke Hindi, 6.52% Korku and 1.76% Gondi as their first language.

Government and politics
Harda (district) has two assembly seats in the Madhya Pradesh Legislative Assembly: Harda (Harda, Khirkiya) and Timarni (Timarni, Sirali). As of 2018, the MLA from Harda is Kamal Patel and Sanjay Shah Makdai is the MLA from Timarni.

See also
 Sirali
 Khirkiya
 Ghanta-Ghar
 Rahatgaon
 Timarni
 Handia
 Pandharmati

References

External links
 Official website

 
Districts of Madhya Pradesh
1998 establishments in Madhya Pradesh